Below are the rosters for the 2003 FIFA World Youth Championship tournament in UAE.

Players name marked in bold went on to earn full international caps.

Group A

Head coach:  Mart Nooij

Head coach:  Gary Stempel

Head coach: Peter Polak

Head coach:  Jean François Jodar

Group B

Head coach: Hugo Tocalli

Head coach: Mamadou Coulibaly

Head coach: José Ufarte

Head coach: Viktor Borisov

Group C

Head coach: Ange Postecoglou

Head coach: Marcos Paqueta

Head coach: Dale Mitchell

Head coach: Pavel Vrba

Group D

Head coach: Reinaldo Rueda

Head coach: Hassan Shehata

Head coach: Les Reed

Head coach: Kiyoshi Okuma

Group E

Head coach: Mama Ouattara

Head coach: Eduardo Rergis

Head coach: Gerry Smith

Head coach:  Daniel Romeo

Group F

Head coach: Uli Stielike

Head coach: Park Sung-wha

Head coach: Rolando Chilavert

Head coach:  Thomas Rongen

References

External links
FIFA.com

FIFA U-20 World Cup squads
FIFA World Youth Championship